Oxford High School is a coed public secondary institution located in Oxford, Michigan within the Oxford Community Schools district.  The school draws from an area of The Village of Oxford and Oxford Township, as well as portions of Orion Township, Dryden Township, Metamora Township and Addison Township. It is one of the largest districts, geographically, in southeastern lower Michigan.

History
The current site for Oxford High School opened in 2004.  Prior to that, the current site was a middle school.  When renovations were completed, the middle school and high school swapped buildings, with the middle school now located in the old high school building on Lakeville Road.

Since opening the most recent building in 2004, OHS has added over 500 students to its enrollment.

On November 30, 2021, a mass shooting occurred at the school, killing four students and injuring seven other people.

Education
Oxford High School is an authorized International Baccalaureate World School for the Diploma Programme.

Athletics
Oxford High School offers 24 different varsity sports.  Teams participate in the Oakland Activities Association, a high school athletic conference whose member schools have similar enrollments and are all located in the Oakland County area.  The statewide class designation (based on enrollment) is "Division 1" or "Class A".

The primary mascot for Oxford Schools is the Wildcat. Both the high school and the middle school have teams which are referred to as the "Oxford Wildcats".  Oxford's chief rival is Lake Orion, located directly in the township to the south, and connected by M-24.  In football, the two teams compete for the "Double-O" (Oxford/Orion) rivalry trophy.  The teams had competed annually from at least 1950 until 1983, when Oxford moved to the Flint Metro League.  During FML play, Oxford's chief rivals were Lapeer East High School and Lapeer West High School, located in Lapeer approxamitely 15 miles north of Oxford on M-24.

Prior to the 2010-2011 year, Oxford High School moved from the Flint Metro League, where it had been a member school since 1983, to the Oakland Activities Association. Reasons cited for the move included demographic and geographic considerations. Urban sprawl in Metro Detroit over the years had brought Oxford in from the rural–urban fringe and closer in-line with the greater Detroit area like much of the OAA, rather than the Flint area.  As a result of the move, the sports rivalry with Lake Orion resumed after a 27 year hiatus.

Oxford has won state championships in boys track (1991 class B), football (1992 class BB), and wrestling (2011 class A).

In 2011, Oxford athletics installed blue-colored artificial turf for the football stadium at a cost of $400,000, which was to be paid for with private donations.  Initially, the turf was to be paid for with public bonds, however the millage failed to pass voters.  The AstroTurf made headlines when it was revealed that several athletics boosters had put their personal homes up as collateral for the purchase of the field.  When initial fundraising efforts came up short, the boosters were hit with a $300,000 balance and were in danger of defaulting.  An agreement was reached between the boosters and AstroTurf that allowed for an extended payback period.  The turf also made headlines when Boise State University notified Oxford that they held a trademark on the term "Blue Turf" for their field at Albertsons Stadium.  Therefore, Oxford could not continue calling their field "blue turf", but instead could use the terms "navy turf", "Oxford blue turf", or "true blue turf".

Notable alumni
Jim Bates, 1964, former professional football coach
Eric Ghiaciuc, 2000, former professional football player
Zach Line, 2008, professional football player
Mike Lantry, 1966, former University of Michigan football kicker
Dave Rayner, 2001, former professional football player
Ethan Crumbley, 2021, Perpetrator of the Oxford High School Shooting
Sonia Malavisi, 2012, Italian pole vaulter.

References

External links
 Oxford Schools: Oxford High School

Public high schools in Michigan
School buildings completed in 2004
High schools in Oakland County, Michigan
2004 establishments in Michigan